Salima Hamouche (born January 17, 1984, in Béjaïa) is an Algerian international volleyball player.

Club information
Current club :  GSP (ex MC Algiers)
Debut club :  ASW Bejaia

References
 
 

1984 births
Living people
Algerian women's volleyball players
Volleyball players from Béjaïa
Olympic volleyball players of Algeria
Volleyball players at the 2012 Summer Olympics
Competitors at the 2009 Mediterranean Games
Liberos
Mediterranean Games competitors for Algeria
21st-century Algerian people
Competitors at the 2022 Mediterranean Games
20th-century Algerian people